Casmena congoensis is a species of leaf beetle reported from the Republic of the Congo, the Democratic Republic of the Congo and Ivory Coast. It was first described from Garamba National Park by Brian J. Selman in 1972. The species was collected on Gramineae.

References 

Eumolpinae
Beetles of Africa
Beetles of the Democratic Republic of the Congo
Insects of the Republic of the Congo
Insects of West Africa
Beetles described in 1972